Barbara Aileen Simmonds (born 1961), is a female former athlete who competed for England.

Athletics career
Simmonds was a double National Champion after winning the 1979 and 1982 AAA National Championship title in the high jump.

She represented England in the high jump, at the 1978 Commonwealth Games in Edmonton, Alberta, Canada. Four years later she represented England and won a bronze medal in the high jump event, at the 1982 Commonwealth Games in Brisbane, Queensland, Australia.

References

1961 births
English female high jumpers
Athletes (track and field) at the 1978 Commonwealth Games
Living people
Commonwealth Games medallists in athletics
Commonwealth Games bronze medallists for England
Medallists at the 1982 Commonwealth Games